Ust-Syamzhenets is a rural locality (a village) in Kichmegnskoye Rural Settlement, Kichmengsko-Gorodetsky District, Vologda Oblast, Russia. The population was 38 as of 2002.

Geography 
Ust-Syamzhenets is located 108 km southwest of Kichmengsky Gorodok (the district's administrative centre) by road. Vysokaya is the nearest rural locality.

References 

Rural localities in Kichmengsko-Gorodetsky District